Jordi Carrasco (born 2 March 1975) is a Spanish former medley swimmer who competed in the 2000 Summer Olympics.

References

1975 births
Living people
Spanish male medley swimmers
Olympic swimmers of Spain
Swimmers at the 2000 Summer Olympics